The Balliemore Cup is a knock-out cup in the sport of shinty.  It is the Intermediate Championship run under the auspices of the Camanachd Association and only first teams competing in the National, North Division One and South Division One are eligible for entry.

History

In the early 20th century, Captain Colin MacRae of Balliemore ran a shinty competition in the Kyles of Bute area, and the trophy was competed for by teams such as Kyles, Bute, North Bute, Balliemore and Rhubaan Rovers. The trophy was donated for competition by his brother, Major MacRae Gilstrap.

However, after a long period without being played for the cup was presented to the Camanachd Association by Captain Duncan MacRae of Eilean Donan  to be used as a trophy for national competition between teams at an intermediate level, i.e. those teams who had little chance of winning the Camanachd Cup but who were also ineligible for the Junior championship, the Sir William Sutherland Cup.

The cup was first played for as the Intermediate Championship in 1985 and was won by Bute Shinty Club 3-2 against Glengarry Shinty Club. In 2009, Bute hosted the final which was the first Balliemore final to be televised, and it was broadcast by BBC Alba. The 2010 final was notable for a match-winning save by the Kinlochshiel keeper using his head, which became a widely distributed viral hit on the internet.

Previous winners
1985   Bute 3, Glengarry 2

1986   Strathglass 4, Col-Glen  2, (after extra time)

1987   Lochaber Camanachd 4, Bute 0, replay after 1-1 draw

1988   Glengarry 2, Bute 1

1989   Glengarry 5, Kilmory 3

1990   Glenurquhart Shinty Club  8, Col-Glen 0

1991   Glenurquhart 5, Ballachulish 0

1992   Kilmallie 5, Kilmory Camanachd 3

1993   Kilmallie 2, Inverness 1

1994   Lochaber 4, Kinlochshiel 2

1995   Caberfeidh 3, Kilmallie 1

1996   Caberfeidh 3, Kinlochshiel 2

1997   Caberfeidh 2, Kilmallie 1

1998   Caberfeidh 3, Tayforth 2

1999   Lochcarron 1, Skye Camanachd 1, (Lochcarron won 3-2 on penalties after extra time)

2000   Caberfeidh 3, Glasgow Mid-Argyll 3, (Caberfeidh won 3-2 on penalties after extra time)

2001   Inveraray 6, Ballachullish 1

2002   Lochcarron 2, Kyles Athletic 1, (after extra time)

2003   Strathglass 3, Skye Camanachd 3, (Strathglass won 3-2 on penalties after extra time)

2004   Bute 2, Lochaber 0

2005   Kyles Athletic 3, Kinlochshiel 1

2006   Bute 2,  Beauly 1, in Beauly

2007   Kinlochshiel 1, Glenurquhart 0, in Newtonmore, (original final rained off in Oban)

2008   Skye Camanachd 3, Kilmalle 1, in Beauly

2009   Strathglass 5, Kinlochshiel 1, in Rothesay

2010   Kinlochshiel 3, Lochaber 3, (Kinlochshiel win 2-0 on penalties) at An Aird, Fort William

2011   Bute 2, Caberfeidh 1, at Pairc nan Laoch in Portree

2012   Lochaber 5, Beauly 1, at Castle Leod in Strathpeffer

2013   Bute 4, Beauly 2

2014   Skye Camanachd 3, Ballachulish 2, at Taynuilt

2015   Beauly 5, GMA 3

2016   Kilmallie 6, Caberfeidh 0

2017 Caberfeidh 4-4 Fort William,  Fort William won 5-4 in penalties, at Drumnadrochit 

2018 Kilmallie 3-2 GMA, at Fort William

2019 Fort William 3-2 GMA, at Fort William 

2020 No competition due to COVID-19

2021 Skye 3-1 Beauly, at Fort William 

2022 Beauly 5-1 Inveraray, at Fort William

Wins by Club

External links
Official site

Shinty competitions